Trophinin is a protein that in humans is encoded by the TRO gene.

This gene encodes a membrane protein that mediates apical cell adhesion between trophoblastic cells and luminal epithelial cells of the endometrium and is implicated in the initial attachment during the process of embryo implantation. This gene is related to the MAGED gene family by sequence similarity and chromosome location. Multiple alternatively spliced transcript variants have been found for this gene; however, the full-length nature of some variants has not been defined.

References

Further reading